Lennox Dominique "Terry" Dehere (born September 12, 1971) is an American former basketball player who played six seasons in the National Basketball Association (NBA) and was an All-American college player at Seton Hall University. Following his playing career, Dehere became active in Democratic Party politics, as well as a restaurateur.

Dehere was born in New York City, and grew up in Jersey City, New Jersey, and played basketball under Coach Bob Hurley while attending St. Anthony's High School in Jersey City, New Jersey.  It is through this relationship that he is best friends with the coach's son, Bobby Hurley.

College career 
Dehere played for Seton Hall from 1989 until 1993, where he had held the school and conference record with 2,494 career points, as well as school career records for 3-point field goals made and 3-point field goals attempted. Dehere also holds single season records for 3-point field goals made and 3-point field goal percentage. He was named Big East Player of the Year in the 1992–93 season, as well as Conference Tournament MVP.

Professional career 

A 6'2", 190-lb. guard, he was selected 13th overall by the Los Angeles Clippers in the 1993 NBA Draft. He played for the Clippers, Sacramento Kings and Vancouver Grizzlies averaging 8.0 ppg during his NBA career which spanned six seasons. Dehere also played two seasons in Germany.  In January 2002, Dehere signed with the Florida Flame of the National Basketball Development League (NBDL).

Community involvement 

In 1994, Dehere donated $75,000 to rehabilitate the Garfield Park basketball court where he had played in his youth. He also worked with others in the community to rebuild the youth recreational basketball program at the park. The court was renamed by the City of Jersey City in Dehere's honor. After retiring from the NBA, Dehere returned to his hometown of Jersey City. He is currently the owner of Sanai's at the Newkirk-Summit House, a restaurant in the oldest standing building in the city. He is also the Chairman of the Jersey City Community Housing Corporation, a non-profit corporation involved in the construction of affordable housing.

Politics 

Dehere made his political debut as a candidate for an at-large council seat in the Jersey City municipal election of 2001.

On April 27, 2007, Dehere was elected to serve as a member of the Jersey City Board of Education where he served on the Legal and Affirmative Action Committees. He became vice president of the board on May 21, 2009. He served one term, which expired in April 2010, and was defeated for reelection.

References

External links
Basketball-Reference.com: Terry Dehere

1971 births
Living people
Alba Berlin players
All-American college men's basketball players
American athlete-politicians
American expatriate basketball people in Canada
American expatriate basketball people in Germany
American men's basketball players
Basketball players at the 1991 Pan American Games
Basketball players from Jersey City, New Jersey
Basketball players from New York City
Charleston Lowgators players
Los Angeles Clippers draft picks
Los Angeles Clippers players
Pan American Games bronze medalists for the United States
Pan American Games medalists in basketball
Point guards
Sacramento Kings players
Seton Hall Pirates men's basketball players
Shooting guards
Vancouver Grizzlies players
Medalists at the 1991 Pan American Games